The larger urban zone (LUZ), or functional urban area (FUA), is a measure of the population and expanse of metropolitan and surrounding areas which may or may not be exclusively urban. It consists of a city and its commuting zone outside it.

The definition was introduced in 2004 by Eurostat, the statistical agency of the European Union (EU), in agreement with the national statistics offices in the member states. Eurostat data is provided only for zones in the EU countries, candidate countries and EFTA countries. Several cities were excluded by definition from the 2004 list of LUZs on technical, definitional grounds, such as the coincidence of the metropolitan area with the urban zone.

The LUZ represents an attempt at a harmonised definition of the metropolitan area. Eurostat's objective was to have an area from which a significant share of the residents commute into the city, a concept known as the "functional urban region." To ensure a good data availability, Eurostat adjusts the LUZ boundaries to administrative boundaries that approximate the functional urban region.

In 2006 LUZ definitions were changed significantly, improving the comparability of LUZ definitions across different countries, and allowing for almost all cities to be included.

List of larger urban zones

This is a list of larger urban zones. The Urban Audit also includes cities from EFTA countries (Iceland, Liechtenstein, Norway and Switzerland) and EU candidate countries. The Organisation for Economic Co-operation and Development (OECD) uses a similar definition of Functional Urban Area to represent population sizes of cities in OECD countries. This data is also included.

The figures in the Eurostat database are an attempt at a compromise between harmonised data for all of the European Union, and with availability of statistical data, making comparisons more accurate.

List of larger urban zones by population as of 2017

This is a list of larger urban zones by population as of 2017. The 2004 Urban Audit also includes cities from EFTA countries (Iceland, Liechtenstein, Norway and Switzerland) and EU candidate countries, although the only candidate country for which there is available data is Turkey. Some cities, including Marseille, Lille, Nice, Cordoba, Badajoz, Toulon and Montpellier were excluded from the 2004 list on technical, definitional grounds, such as the coincidence of the metropolitan area with the urban zone.

Urban Audit
Eurostat's Urban Audit is about much more than demographics.  In order for it to be useful as a policy tool to the European Commission and other authorities it contains data for over 250 indicators across the following domains:

 Demography
 Social aspects
 Economic aspects
 Civic involvement
 Training and education
 Environment
 Travel and transport
 Information society
 Culture and recreation

See also
List of cities in the European Union by population within city limits
List of urban areas in the European Union
List of metropolitan areas in Europe
Largest metropolitan areas in the Nordic countries
World's largest cities

Notes

References

External links
 GMES Urban Atlas: PDF files, ZIP files
 Eurostat: European cities
 Eurostat: Total population in Urban Audit cities, Larger Urban Zone

European Union-related lists
Lists of cities in Europe
Urban planning by country

Metropolitan areas of the European Union